Jasper M. Brancato (November 26, 1907 – March 18, 1976) was an American politician who served in the Missouri Senate.  He served in the U.S. Army in the quartermaster corps during World War II.

References

1907 births
1976 deaths
Politicians from Kansas City, Missouri
Military personnel from Missouri
Democratic Party Missouri state senators
United States Army soldiers
20th-century American politicians